Harith or Hareth is a common Arabic name, meaning "the great lion" or "he who digs the earth". Notable people with the name include:

 Ali ibn Abd al-Muttalib, one of the uncles of Muhammad
 Al-Harith ibn Hilliza al-Yashkuri, 5th century pre-Islamic Arabian poet
 Azazil, also known as Ḥārith, the name of Iblis before he was expelled from heaven
 Harith al-Dhari (1941–2015), an Iraqi Sunni Arab cleric
 Harith Gassani,  Arab Christian governor of Sham and contemporary of Muhammad
 Harith al-Hamdani, a contemporary of Muhammad
 Harith ibn Harb, brother of the man who would be Muhammad's arch enemy, Abu Sufyan ibn Harb
 Harith Iskander (born 1966), a Malaysian actor and comedian
 Harith Lim (born 1970), a professional Singaporean darts player 
 Harith Maduwantha (born 1994), a Sri Lankan cricketer
 Harith al-Muhasibi (781–857), founder of the Baghdad School of Islamic philosophy
 Harith bin Ghazi al-Nadhari (died 2015), an official of Al Qaeda in the Arabian Peninsula
 Hareth Al Naif (born 1993), a Syrian footballer
 Harith al-Obeidi (died 2009), an Iraqi politician
 Harith ibn Rab'i, one of the companions of Muhammad
 Harith al-Sudani (died 2017), Iraqi militaryman, spy and war hero
 Hareth Shanshal Sunaid, an Iraqi politician

See also

Arethas (disambiguation), the Greek form of the Arabic name Harith
Aretas (disambiguation), another spelling of the Greek form
Banu al-Harith, an Arabian tribe
The Curse on Hareth, a 1982 role-playing game 
Haris, Salfit, a Palestinian town formerly known as Harith